Xiao Xiangrong (September 6, 1910 – March 26, 1976) birth name Xiao Muyuan was a lieutenant general in the People's Liberation Army. Born in Guangdong Province, Xiao attended the Whampoa Military Academy in 1925. As a member of the Chinese Workers' and Peasants' Red Army during the Chinese Civil War, he was based in Yongding County, western Fujian Province, near the border region of Fujian, Guangdong and Jiangxi. He later relocated to the border region of Shaanxi, Gansu and Ningxia where he was a member of the 115th Division of the Eighth Route Army during the Second Sino-Japanese War. After liberation, he became the first director of the CCP Military Affairs Committee General Office. He was persecuted during the Cultural Revolution.

References

Bibliography
MACFARQUHAR, Robert. Mao's Last Revolution
Teiwes, Frederick C., Warren Sun. The Tragedy of Lin Biao: Riding the Tiger During the Cultural Revolution

1910 births
1976 deaths
People from Meixian District
People's Liberation Army generals from Guangdong
Delegates to the 3rd National People's Congress
Victims of the Cultural Revolution
People of Central Military Commission (China)